Amancay or Amankay is a common name of Quechua origin.

Yurak amankay (Quechua for 'white lily') was occasionally used as a title, with the addition of several more, when referring to the most respected noble ladies of the Inca Empire.

The original denomination for the city of Abancay, capital of the Apurimac region in Peru, is attributed to a princess or "ñusta" of Inca epoch called Amanqay. In essence, the word Abancay comes from a corruption of the Quechua "Hamanqay o Amancaes" (Hemenocallis longipetala).

Amancay may refer to several plants:

Alstroemeria, which is commonly called Peruvian Lily or Lily of the Incas, in South America, especially
Alstroemeria pelegrina
Alstroemeria fiebrigiana
Alstroemeria aurantiaca
Alstroemeria patagonica
Lagerstroemia species, which are often called "Amancay" in cultivation.
Ismene amancaes, which is called Peruvian daffodil or Amancae

See also 

 Abancay
 Alstroemeria
 Inca Empire

References